Aaron Dunphy (born 1998) is an Irish hurler who plays for Laois Senior Championship club Borris-in-Ossory/Kilcotton and at inter-county level with the Laois senior hurling team. He usually lines out as a right wing-forward.

Honours

Borris-in-Ossory/Kilcotton
Laois Senior Hurling Championship (1): 2016

Laois
Joe McDonagh Cup (1): 2019

References

External links
Aaron Dunphy profile at the Laois GAA website

1995 births
Living people
Borris-in-Ossory/Kilcotton hurlers
Laois inter-county hurlers